Aleph at Hallucinatory Mountain is a studio album by the British experimental band Current 93, released in May 2009 on Coptic Cat Records.
After collaborating with Om on a split EP, there is a notably heavy sound on this record, citing doom metal and stoner rock as influences. There was also a limited edition of the recording for subscribers who paid in advance including a second CD with a rough mix of the tracks and also a monophonic version that was released for the band's concert at German Wave Gotik Treffen 2009 with all of the tracks titled differently, though the music remains the same.

Track listing 
 "Invocation of Almost" – 8:49
 "Poppyskins" – 5:17
 "On Docetic Mountain" – 8:14
 "26 April 2007" – 5:13
 "Aleph is the Butterfly Net" – 5:54
 "Not Because the Fox Barks" – 10:14
 "UrShadow" – 4:37
 "As Real as Rainbows" – 5:23

Personnel 
David Tibet – vocals, july guitar, gorgon guitar, mixing, production
James Blackshaw – 12-string guitar, piano
William Breeze – electric viola, viola controlled sampler
Ossian Brown – synthesizers, treated organ, electronics
John Contreras – cello, synthesizers
Baby Dee – piano, hammond organ
Andria Degens – vocals
Sasha Grey – vocals
Andrew Liles – electronics, guitars, mixing, production
Alex Neilson – drums, percussion
Rickie Lee Jones – vocals
Alice Rousham – vocals
Henry Rousham – vocals
Steven Stapleton – electronics, mixing, production
Matt Sweeney – electric guitar, vocals
Andrew WK – bass, piano, vocals, finger bells
Keith Wood – electric guitar, acoustic guitar, slide guitar, bass

References 

2009 albums
Current 93 albums